Aviation High School (Aviation, AHS, Avi-Hi) was a High School located in Redondo Beach, California that was in operation from 1957 to 1982.  The school was located at the corner of Manhattan Beach Boulevard and Aviation Boulevard (which runs north to the Los Angeles International Airport).  Their athletic teams were known as the Falcons and the school colors were black and orange.

Because of mushrooming growth in the South Bay, Los Angeles beach communities (Manhattan Beach, Redondo Beach, and Hermosa Beach), the school was built in 1957 (at a cost of 4 million dollars) by the then South Bay Union High School District which has today broken into the Redondo Beach Unified School District and the Manhattan Beach Unified School District; the district included two other high schools: Redondo Union High School and Mira Costa High School.  Other proposed names for the school were Pilot George High, Will Rogers High, Kittyhawk High and—the second runner-up—Aileen S. Hammond High.

Aviation High School served students from both Redondo Beach and Manhattan Beach.  At its construction, Aviation's facilities—largely single-story buildings radiating out from a central quad—were considered "ultra-modern".  In the late 1960s a large auditorium was added to the campus.

School closure

Because of budgetary constraints in the early 1980s, in part due to California Proposition 13 (1978), the South Bay Union High School District decided in November 1981 to close one of its three area comprehensive high schools, but promised teachers and administrators that they would not lose their jobs. Savings were projected at $1 million in maintenance costs.  After much deliberation (via a 21-member citizen's committee) and several public forums, the district decided in April 1982 to close Aviation.

Many in the South Bay community saw this decision as unsound (closure would result in overcrowding of the two remaining schools and would not be a viable long-term strategy if district enrollment increased; in addition, Aviation had the newest facilities of the three area high schools. Some viewed the decision as based on area politics and geography (Redondo and Mira Costa High Schools were more centrally located and better anchored to their historic communities); some accused the decision of being in part motivated by the prospect of selling or leasing the facilities to Aviation High School's large corporate neighbor, the defense and credit-reporting company TRW.  For some time after the school's closure, TRW did lease part of the facilities, including the gym, the track and field, and the auditorium; however, the city maintained the facilities.

In 1983, Aviation's non-graduating students were sent to Redondo Union High School and Mira Costa High School, depending on their residence location (to avoid overcrowding at Redondo High School, Mira Costa High School's resident limits were extended outside of Manhattan beach to incorporate part of Redondo Beach).

Post-closure

In 1984 Overton, Moore & Associates began negotiating with the South Bay Union HSD over possibly buying portions of the school property.

In summer 1984 Redondo Beach voters approved of making part of the high school property into a recreational area, so South Bay Union HSD decided to designate a separate  for that. In 1985 the city government agreed to lease  of the property.

Classrooms of the campus were demolished in 1982, but the theater, gymnasium and track and field were maintained.  The site of the campus is now the  "Aviation Park", home to the Redondo Beach Performing Arts Center (with a 1457-seat theater, recently renovated), the Aviation Gymnasium (including a 12,000 sq ft (1,100 m²). and 6,300 sq ft (590 m²). gyms and a 1,221 sq ft (113 m²) dance room) and the Aviation Track & Field, where an artificial grass soccer field is now surrounded by a 440-yard, five-lane, all weather running track using the original curb.

In 2014, a mural depicting the school's mascot was erected in the remaining Aviation Gymnasium. The gym currently serves as the venue for the co-rec program "Tri City," a dance for middle school students within the Redondo Beach, Hermosa Beach, and Manhattan Beach school districts.

Notable alumni
Richard Breeden - chairman of U.S. Securities & Exchange Commission
Bill Caudill - MLB pitcher
June Fairchild – actress
Tom Hintnaus — 1976, 1984 Olympic pole vaulter; Calvin Klein model
Wes Jones - Architect, Director of Graduate Architecture Programs, USC
Allan McCollum — contemporary artist
Leah Langford - Software Engineer
Michele Tafoya - sportscaster
David Vanole - soccer goalkeeper
Paul Westphal - NCAA and NBA basketball coach
Gilby Clarke - musician
Amanda Wyss - Actress; Fast Times at Ridgemont High, A Nightmare on Elm Street
Lydia Bree - Gymnast (Rhythmic) 1982 U.S. all-around champion and USA Gymnastics Athlete of the Year, alternate for the 1984 Olympic Team. 
Larry Poindexter - Actor; S.W.A.T, American Ninja, General Hospital, JAG
Tim Green - NCAA Football Quarterback (USC) Pacific-10 Conference Champion, Rose Bowl MVP
Richard Householder - LAPD Retired - Recipient of the Medal of Valor and the Purple Heart from the Los Angeles Police Department. Aviation Graduate of the Class of 1977
Johnny Ray Jones - Singer/Songwriter; Entertainer; Record Producer; Albums; “Feet Back In The Door” - “Way Down South” -  On MoonDogg Records
Chuck McCollum - Actor and casting director; Agents of Shield, Criminal Minds, Hawaii Five-O and numerous others https://www.imdb.com/name/nm0566133/

See also
 List of closed secondary schools in California

References

External links
reunion site - Annual All Class Reunion held on the last weekend of July
reunion site - includes pictures of 1982 demolition
Present-day Aviation Park

Educational institutions established in 1957
High schools in Los Angeles County, California
Defunct schools in California
Redondo Beach, California
1957 establishments in California
Buildings and structures demolished in 1982
Demolished buildings and structures in California